Euvespivora is a genus of parasitic flies in the family Tachinidae.

Species
Euvespivora decipiens (Walker, 1859)
Euvespivora orientalis Baranov, 1942

References

Exoristinae
Diptera of Asia
Diptera of Australasia
Tachinidae genera